Daniel Maldini (born 11 October 2001) is an Italian professional footballer who plays as an attacking midfielder for  club Spezia, on loan from AC Milan.

Early life
Maldini was born in Milan, the second son of Paolo Maldini, then captain of AC Milan, and Venezuelan model Adriana Fossa. His grandfather Cesare also captained Milan in the 1960s, making him the third generation to make appearances for the club. His elder brother Christian played for Milan's youth teams and went on to play professionally at a lower level.

Club career

Youth career
Maldini joined Milan's youth system in 2010, and over the following years he came through the various age-group teams, from the under-10 Pulcini to the under-19 Primavera. In the 2016–17 season, he was part of the squad that won the Under-16 National Championship (Campionato Nazionale Under-16), defeating Lazio 5–2 in the final.

Senior career
On 2 February 2020, Maldini made his senior debut with Milan in a 1–1 Serie A home draw against Hellas Verona, coming on as an added-time substitute for Samu Castillejo.

On 15 September 2021, Maldini came off the bench against Liverpool in a 3–2 defeat on his UEFA Champions League debut. On 25 September, Maldini started his first match for Milan in Serie A and scored the first goal in a 2–1 away win against Spezia.

On 22 May 2022, he won his first trophy, the Serie A championship, like his father, Paolo Maldini and grandfather, Cesare Maldini before him. Throughout the season, he did not break through into the starting lineup, playing only 239 minutes in 13 matches in the club's league-winning 2021–22 Serie A campaign.

Loan to Spezia
On 29 July 2022, fellow Serie A side Spezia announced Maldini had joined the club on a one-year loan from AC Milan.

On 5 November 2022, on his league debut as a starter with Spezia, Maldini scored his first Serie A goal of the season against his parent team, AC Milan. On 10 March 2023, he scored a goal in a 2–1 victory over Inter Milan, to be Spezia's first ever win against the latter.

International career
Maldini won his first international cap for Italy at the under-18 level, in a 2–0 win against the Netherlands on 22 March 2019. Later that year, he won two caps for the under-19.

In 2021, he was capped three times for Italy under-20 and he scored his first international goal in a 1–1 draw against England on 7 October 2021.

Style of play 
Although in his very early days Maldini played as a defender like both his father Paolo and grandfather Cesare, he soon started to be employed in offensive roles. Today he mainly plays as a free roaming attacking midfielder, a position that suits his playmaking ability, dribbling skills, ball control, and vision.

Career statistics

Club

International

Honours
AC Milan
Serie A: 2021–22

References

External links

2001 births
Living people
Italian people of Slovene descent
Italian people of Venezuelan descent
Italian footballers
Footballers from Milan
Association football midfielders
Italy youth international footballers
Serie A players
A.C. Milan players
Spezia Calcio players
Daniel